John Sheppard   was an American professional baseball player, who played in three games for the Baltimore Marylands in 1873.

References

External links

Major League Baseball outfielders
Baseball players from Maryland
Baltimore Marylands players
19th-century baseball players
Date of birth missing
Date of death missing